Zine is a surname. Notable people with the surname include:

Abdellah Ez Zine, Moroccan paralympic athlete
Dennis Zine (born 1947), American politician
Karol Zine, Indian television actress
Mohammed Chaouki Zine (born 1972), Algerian philosopher and writer